is a Japanese football player for Kyoto Sanga.

Career
After attending at Senshu University, Misawa joined YSCC Yokohama.

Club statistics
Updated to 2 January 2021.

References

External links

Profile at J. League
Profile at YSCC Yokohama

1995 births
Living people
Association football people from Iwate Prefecture
Japanese footballers
J2 League players
J3 League players
YSCC Yokohama players
Gainare Tottori players
Kyoto Sanga FC players
Association football midfielders